Ricky Anderson is a retired Canadian boxer, born in historic Africville, Nova Scotia.  Anderson was due to represent Canada at the 1980 Summer Olympics in Moscow, but the Canadian teams boycotted the event. He soon became a top amateur boxer, and later a champion professional boxer.

Biography

Olympic career
Making Canada's Olympic team was the biggest highlight of the young light-welterweights' career up to that point. Later that year, Anderson won a gold medal in the light-welterweight division at the Acropolis Cup tournament in Athens, Greece before the Moscow Olympic boycott was announced. Anderson was unaware that politics ran so deeply in sports and he felt in his heart he would be going to Moscow, it never happened. Hear Anderson's personal comments on the boycott in a 2012 Chronicle Herald article entitled: An Olympic dream KO'd by politics.

Amateur career
Nova Scotia’s Ricky Anderson would prove that he was a champion from the first time he fought as an Amateur in 1974. He’d go on to win the Nova Scotia Fly-weight title in his first year as a boxer. In 1975, he’d capture a Silver medal at that year’s Canada Games held in Lethbridge AB. In 1977, Ricky Anderson would become the first Canadian born boxer to beat a Cuban fighter. In 1980, Ricky made the Canadian Olympic Team but he would not get the chance to represent his country as Canada would boycott the Games in Moscow that year.

Yet, 1981 was another big year for Anderson, he won his fourth amateur Canadian Championship. Then, in Shreveport, La., he added the North American light-welterweight crown to his growing collection of gold medals by knocking out U.S. Champion James Mitchell, a former World Army Champion.  Following the win over Mitchell, he was named Canadian athlete of the month for September by the Canadian Sports Federation. The stage was now set for the 1981 World Cup of Boxing in Montreal, he would battle for the world championship against Vasily Shyshev of the Soviet Union. Anderson said, he went into the fight a little overanxious. The first two rounds were close and Anderson would need to win the final round to win the fight. But Vasily Shyshev turned it on in the last round and won the fight. Anderson had knocked on the door of a world championship and just missed by a few punches.

Anderson had come to this point twice in his amateur career, losing in world championship bouts, in 1979 at the World Junior championship in Yokohama, Japan he lost a narrow decision in the gold medal round to a fighter from the Soviet Union.(Anderson was the first Canadian to win a Silver medal at that level.) But in light of those past performances, he was quite pleased with what he had achieved. His overall amateur record stands at 97 fights, with 85 wins and 12 losses

Professional career
In 1985, Anderson finally got what he was looking for—a crack at the Canadian Welterweight Boxing Championship. He was delighted by the fact that he was going to meet Guerrero Chavez in a rematch. Anderson said that the Chavez loss might have been the best thing to happen to him. It had opened his eyes and made him realize that he couldn't go in and take out a man like Guerro Chavez in one round. He had to go in, work hard and take his time. Before the fight, Chavez was a picture of confidence, blowing kisses to the ladies at ring-side, mugging for the cameras, and hamming it up for the crowd. This time, however, the ending would be different. This time Anderson would make no mistakes. Anderson fought a text-book fight, using a stinging right hand to set up Chavez in the same corner where he had dominated Chavez in their previous fight. The end came quickly in the eighth round when Anderson delivered a straight left hand that put Chavez down. Chavez was in no shape to continue.

Anderson was the new Canadian welterweight champion, a dream come true for the Halifax native.

Education
Following his 12 year boxing career, Anderson completed his education at Saint Mary's University and currently works as a Drug Prevention Specialist at Addiction Services in Dartmouth. NS. Anderson was once quoted by the Halifax Herald during a Race Against Drugs Program at a local school, when he was asked who is at risk? Anderson replied, "I'm at risk, you're at risk, we are all at risk, keep your dreams alive by not getting involved." Anderson is also the owner of Go Ricky Motivational Services (www.goricky.ca), a motivational consultant company in Halifax. He is a current member of the Nova Scotia Boxing Authority and Canadian Boxing Federation, government agencies that regulates professional boxing and mixed martial arts events provincially and federally. The former CTV Atlantic sportscaster and author of Win in the Arena of Life volunteered for 10 years with the Ward 5 Community Centre in Halifax, two years of which he was chairman of the board. The Ward 5 Community Centre is a non profit organization that runs programs to help youth, seniors and others who may be in needed

Hall of Fame induction
Anderson is a member of both the Canadian Boxing Hall of Fame and the Nova Scotia Sport Hall of Fame.

References

Living people
Saint Mary's University (Halifax) alumni
Writers from Halifax, Nova Scotia
Year of birth missing (living people)
Black Canadian boxers
Black Canadian broadcasters
Black Nova Scotians
Canadian television sportscasters
Black Canadian writers
Canadian non-fiction writers
Canadian male boxers
Light-welterweight boxers
Nova Scotia Sport Hall of Fame inductees
Sportspeople from Halifax, Nova Scotia